Te'Jon Lucas (born October 10, 1998) is an American basketball player. He played college basketball for the Illinois Fighting Illini, the Milwaukee Panthers, and the BYU Cougars.

High school career
Lucas attended Washington High School of Information Technology in Milwaukee, Wisconsin. As a junior, he averaged 14.3 points and 5.2 assists per game, earning Second Team All-Conference honors. Lucas broke his leg during a game in February 2016, causing him to miss the rest of the season. He averaged 20.5 points, 5.3 rebounds, 7.8 assists and 2.8 steals per game as a senior. On September 16, 2015, Lucas committed to playing college basketball for Illinois. Lucas attended the NBA Top 100 camp in June 2015 and had scholarship offers from California, Memphis, Purdue, and Wisconsin, and he strongly considered both USC and Old Dominion before committing to Illinois. Lucas is only the third player from Wisconsin to commit to Illinois, and is the first since 1926.

College career
Lucas averaged 4.8 points and 3.1 assists per game as a freshman. As a sophomore, he averaged 5.7 points and 3.2 assists per game. On March 26, 2018, Lucas declared that he would transfer from Illinois. He announced he would transfer to Milwaukee to complete his remaining eligibility after sitting out for a season. Lucas scored a career-high 31 points twice during his junior season. He averaged 14.6 points, 4.3 rebounds, 5.1 assists and 1.9 steals per game as a junior, earning Second Team All-Horizon League recognition. As a senior, Lucas averaged 14.9 points, 5.8 assists and 4.6 rebounds per game. Following the season, he transferred to BYU for his final season of eligibility, granted by the NCAA due to the COVID-19 pandemic. Lucas averaged 10.4 points and 4.7 assists per game.

Personal life
Lucas is the son of Marie Lewis. His sister Marishonta is an attorney. In August 2021, Lucas signed a Name, Image and Likeness deal with Stele Hats, producing hats with the theme "Find Your Purpose."

Career statistics

College

|-
| style="text-align:left;"| 2016–17
| style="text-align:left;"| Illinois
| 31 || 15 || 20.7 || .409 || .375 || .592 || 1.9 || 3.1 || 1.0 || .0 || 4.8
|-
| style="text-align:left;"| 2017–18
| style="text-align:left;"| Illinois
| 29 || 19 || 21.4 || .478 || .263 || .615 || 2.2 || 3.2 || 1.1 || .1 || 5.7
|-
| style="text-align:left;"| 2018–19
| style="text-align:left;"| Milwaukee
| style="text-align:center;" colspan="11"|  Redshirt
|-
| style="text-align:left;"| 2019–20
| style="text-align:left;"| Milwaukee
| 30 || 30 || 33.4 || .425 || .317 || .794 || 4.3 || 5.1 || 1.9 || .2 || 14.6
|-
| style="text-align:left;"| 2020–21
| style="text-align:left;"| Milwaukee
| 22 || 22 || 32.0 || .392 || .275 || .730 || 4.6 || 5.8 || 1.1 || .3 || 14.9
|-
| style="text-align:left;"| 2021–22
| style="text-align:left;"| BYU
| 34 || 34 || 30.0 || .443 || .318 || .723 || 2.2 || 4.7 || .9 || .1 || 10.4
|- class="sortbottom"
| style="text-align:center;" colspan="2"| Career
| 146 || 120 || 27.3 || .426 || .309 || .713 || 2.9 || 4.3 || 1.2 || .1 || 9.8

References

External links
BYU Cougars bio
Milwaukee Panthers bio
Illinois Fighting Illini bio

1998 births
Living people
American men's basketball players
Basketball players from Milwaukee
Point guards
Illinois Fighting Illini men's basketball players
Milwaukee Panthers men's basketball players
BYU Cougars men's basketball players